Sohaib Abbasi (born August 14, 1956) is a Pakistani-American business executive, computer scientist and philanthropist. He is the former chairman and chief executive of Informatica having served in the roles from 2004 until 2015. During his tenure as CEO, Abbasi helped to grow the company's revenue from $219 million to over $1 billion, and to increase the value of stock by over 800 percent.

He was also a member of the executive committee of Oracle Corporation and led Oracle Tools and Oracle Education as senior vice president. He retired from these roles in 2003 after 20 years with the company and is credited with helping to grow the company from a startup into an industry leader.

Abbasi joined the board of directors for the software company, Red Hat Inc. in 2011. In May 2016, Abbasi joined the board of directors for the San Francisco-based analytics company, New Relic. And in August 2017, Abbasi joined the board of directors for San Francisco-based StreamSets, Inc., an innovator in smart data pipelines for data engineers.

Early life and education 
Abbasi was born in Lahore, Pakistan in 1956 and moved to various cities with his father, an air force official, before reaching the United States in 1974 to attend college at the University of Illinois at Urbana-Champaign. Abbasi graduated with honors and obtained a bachelor's degree in Computer Science in 1978. He later earned his masters in the same field in 1980.

Career

Early career 
Abbasi began his professional career as a product manager for Professional Computer Resources in 1980. He developed financial modeling software and ERP applications there before launching his own company, Outlook Software, Inc.

Oracle 
Abbasi joined Oracle while the company was a startup in 1982, as the manager of Midwestern Sales. Following his success in sales, Abbasi became manager of user interface development in 1984 where he created Oracle's first application programming tool, SQL*Forms. The software was first introduced in 1985 and was used by over 90 percent of all Oracle DBMS shops by 1990.

Abbasi also launched the software tools division at Oracle, which includes application development tools, business intelligence tools, e-business portal tools and pharmaceutical and Internet learning applications. He helped grow the tools division of the company from its initial launch to generating revenues of $3.75 billion during his tenure with the company. By 1989, he was named the vice-president of Tools and Multi-media for the company. Abbasi was promoted further in 1994 to senior vice-president of Tools Product Division. From 2001 until his retirement from the company in 2003, Abbasi held the role of senior vice president in both the Tools and Education divisions.

He retired from Oracle in 2003 after 20 years and is credited with helping the company grow from a 30 employee startup with $4 million in revenue, to a company with more than 40,000 employees and revenue near $10 billion.

Informatica 
In 2004, Abbasi joined the software company, Informatica, as chief executive officer. Before Abbasi joined the company it had reported negative product license growth in 10 of the prior 12 quarters. Under his leadership, Informatica streamlined its operations by cutting its analytic application software development and focusing on the data warehousing component of its business. The decision was controversial at the time with resistance among employees and on the board, but Abbasi refocused the company on a narrower set of products, while evangelizing the broader use of data integration across the enterprise. The company grew its core market, eventually increasing its revenue from $219 million in fiscal 2004 to $455 million in 2008. Informatica's 20 percent growth rate over this period was 2.5 times the average for the software industry.

During the recession, Abbasi urged the company's salespeople to focus on smaller business-critical deals rather than waiting to close bigger ones that might not materialize. The company concluded 2009 with $456 million in sales with an increase in revenue for each of the first three quarters of the year. Abbasi led the company through the recession with it experiencing 10 percent revenue growth and 20 percent non-GAAP net income growth, while non-GAAP operating margins expanded 3% to an annual record 25%. The company's growth also allowed hiring and expansion to continue through the recession.

In 2010, Informatica reached a revenue of $650 million a nearly 300% increase over the revenue the company had experienced when Abbasi became CEO and a 31% increase from the year before. That same year Abbasi helped the company to grow its sales outside of North America to 36% of its business.

In 2014, after ten years of Abbasi's leadership, Informatica reached $1 billion in sales. In April 2015, Informatica announced that shareholders had approved the acquisition by Permira funds and Canada Pension Plan Investment Board for $5.3 billion or roughly $48 a share. After the deal was completed, Abbasi stepped down as CEO and remained with the company as chairman. During his tenure as CEO the company's customer base increased from around 2,100 in 2004, to over 5,000 in 2014, employee count during this same time grew from 837 to 3,664. The company's annual profitability increased by over 850 percent and its stock appreciated over 800 percent during the same time period.

Philanthropy 
In 2003, Abbasi and his wife, Sara, created a $2.5 million endowment for a program in Islamic studies at Stanford University. The program included graduate fellowships, research, a new library, stronger language courses at advanced levels, and regular public events such as lectures by eminent scholars. At the same time, Stanford alumna Lysbeth Warren made a gift of US$2 million for a new professorship on Islam. Stanford matched both gifts with a grant from the William and Flora Hewlett Foundation, bringing the total endowment for the program and professorship to US$9 million.

The Abbasis established the Sohaib and Sara Abbasi Professorship at the University of Illinois at Urbana-Champaign to help the university maintain its position as a national leader in computer science. They also founded the Sohaib and Sara Abbasi Computer Science Fellowship to allow students, preferably from Pakistan, to attend the institution.

Abbasi also played a key role in establishing the Oracle Academic Initiative in Pakistan, which has trained hundreds of professionals.

Recognition 
During his tenure with Informatica, Abbasi received several awards for his performance. Abbasi won the Chairman of the Year Award from the American Business Awards in 2010 and was ranked second by Institutional Investor's annual survey of software company CEO's in 2010 and 2011. In 2013, Bloomberg ranked Abbasi second on its Top 20 list of technology leaders. In 2014, according to Forbes, Abbasi was one of the top 5 best CEOs to work for in the Enterprise Software business in 2014.

Notes

Further reading 

 Sohaib Abbasi (Oct. 23, 2006). "5 Steps to a Business Turnaround". Sandhill.com.
 "Informatica: Stitching Together Technology". Forbes.com (video). September 24, 2009.
 "Informatica CEO Talks Partnerships, Cloud Computing". Street.com (video). September 17, 2009.
 "Forbes Video - CEO Insights: Informatica". Forbes.com. September 16, 2009.
 "Abbasi of Informatica Sees Consolidation in Software Industry". Bloomberg.com. May 15, 2007.

Pakistani chief executives
Oracle employees
Grainger College of Engineering alumni
Living people
1956 births
Pakistani emigrants to the United States
Scientists from Lahore
American people of Pakistani descent